Gerolamo Bollini (1593–1660) was a Roman Catholic prelate who served as Bishop of Isernia (1653–1660).

Biography
Gerolamo Bollini was born in Rome, Italy in 1593 and ordained a priest in the Order of Saint Benedict. On 9 June 1653, he was appointed during the papacy of Pope Innocent X as Bishop of Isernia. On 22 June 1653, he was consecrated bishop by Marcantonio Franciotti, Cardinal-Priest of Santa Maria della Pace, with Giambattista Spada, Titular Patriarch of Constantinople, and Ranuccio Scotti Douglas, Bishop Emeritus of Borgo San Donnino, serving as co-consecrators. He served as Bishop of Isernia until his death in 1660. While bishop, he was the principal co-consecrator of Giuseppe Battaglia, Bishop of Montemarano (1657).

See also 
Catholic Church in Italy

References

External links and additional sources
 (for Chronology of Bishops) 
 (for Chronology of Bishops)  

17th-century Italian Roman Catholic bishops
Bishops appointed by Pope Innocent X
1593 births
1660 deaths